Buford Hayse Pusser (December 12, 1937 – August 21, 1974) was the sheriff of McNairy County, Tennessee, from 1964 to 1970, and constable of Adamsville from 1970 to 1972. Pusser is known for his virtual one-man war on moonshining, prostitution, gambling, and other vices along the Mississippi–Tennessee state line. His efforts have inspired several books, songs,movies and a TV series. He was also a wrestler known as "Buford the Bull" in the Mid-South.

The Buford Pusser Museum was established at the home he lived in at the time of his death in 1974. A Buford Pusser Festival is held each May in his hometown of Adamsville, Tennessee.

Life and career
Buford Pusser was born in Finger, McNairy County, Tennessee, on December 12, 1937, the son of Helen (née Harris) and Carl Pusser. His father was the police chief of Adamsville, Tennessee. He joined the United States Marine Corps when he graduated from high school. His service ended during his United States Marine Corps Recruit Training, when he was given a medical discharge for asthma.

In 1957, he moved to Chicago, where he was a local wrestler known as "Buford The Bull". He married Pauline Mullins on December 5, 1959. Pusser returned home in 1962. He was Adamsville's police chief and constable from 1962 to 1964. After incumbent sheriff James Dickey was killed in an auto accident, Pusser was then elected sheriff of McNairy County, Tennessee, becoming the youngest sheriff in Tennessee's history. Pusser promptly began trying to eliminate the Dixie Mafia and the State Line Mob. 

Pusser survived several assassination attempts. On February 1, 1966, Louise Hathcock attempted to kill Pusser during an on-site investigation of a robbery complaint at The Shamrock. Hathcock fired on Pusser with a concealed .38 pistol. Pusser returned fire and killed Hathcock. On January 2, 1967, Pusser was shot three times by an unidentified gunman.

Already a local hero, Pusser's "war" on the State Line Mob was brought to national prominence when his wife, Pauline, was killed on August 12, 1967, during an assassination ambush intended for Pusser and instigated by Hathcock's common-law husband. Pusser named Kirksey Nix as the contractor of his wife's killers, although neither Nix nor anyone else was ever charged with the crime. Pusser shot and killed an intoxicated Charles Russell Hamilton on December 25, 1968, after responding to a complaint that Hamilton had threatened his landlord with a gun.

Pusser was ineligible for re-election in 1970 due to the term limit then in effect. He was defeated in his bid for sheriff in 1972. Pusser blamed the loss to incumbent Sheriff Clifford Coleman in part on the controversy surrounding the making of the semibiographical movie, Walking Tall. He was re-elected as constable of Adamsville by a majority of voters, who wrote in his name on their ballots. He served as constable for two more years (1970–1972).

Murder of Pauline Pusser
According to Pusser, his phone rang before dawn on the morning of August 12, 1967, informing him of a disturbance on New Hope Road in McNairy County; Pusser responded and his wife Pauline rode along. Shortly after they passed the New Hope Methodist Church, a fast-moving car came alongside theirs and the occupants opened fire, killing Pauline and leaving Pusser for dead. Doctors said he was struck on the left side of his jaw by at least two, or possibly three, rounds from a .30-caliber carbine. He spent 18 days in the hospital before returning home, and needed several more surgeries to restore his appearance.

Despite vowing to bring his wife's murderers to justice, Pusser was unable to bring Kirksey Nix or any of the accused to trial. Nix was sentenced to the Louisiana State Penitentiary in Angola for the 1971 Easter Saturday murder of New Orleans grocer Frank J. Corso. While imprisoned, Nix ordered the 1987 murder-for-hire of Judge Vincent Sherry and his wife Margaret, in Biloxi, Mississippi. His conspirator, Biloxi Mayor Pete Halat, had, in his capacity as Nix's attorney, stolen hundreds of thousands of dollars that Nix had amassed in a massive lonely hearts scam, blaming it on his law partner, Judge Sherry. Nix was later sentenced to isolation for the rest of his life. According to a 1990 AP story in The Town Talk, a newspaper in Alexandria, Louisiana, Nix denied being involved in the drive-by ambush on the Pussers.

Death
Earlier that day, he contracted with Bing Crosby Productions in Memphis to portray himself in the sequel to Walking Tall. That evening, returning home alone from the McNairy County Fair in his specially modified Corvette, Pusser struck an embankment at high speed that ejected him from the vehicle. The car caught fire and burned.

Local speculation as to the cause included rumors of sabotage to the steering mechanism and the tie rods. The state trooper who worked the accident, Paul Ervin, later became McNairy County sheriff. Ervin claimed that Pusser's death was caused by drunk driving without a seat belt. Buford’s daughter, Dwana Pusser, a passenger in another car, came upon the scene of the accident minutes later. No autopsy of Pusser's body was performed. As sheriff, Pusser was credited with surviving seven stabbings and eight shootings. Pusser's memorial service was held at the Adamsville Church of Christ.

In music
Singer Eddie Bond wrote and recorded several songs honoring Pusser, beginning with "Buford Pusser" in 1968. Many of them were collected on a 1973 LP album, Eddie Bond Sings The Legend Of Buford Pusser. Pusser himself was also a recording artist, with "It Happened In Tennessee", released in October 1973 on Stax Records subsidiary Respect. Southern rock band Drive-By Truckers told the story of Pusser's battle with organized crime in the songs "The Boys from Alabama", "Cottonseed", and "The Buford Stick" from their 2004 album The Dirty South. In the songs "The Buford Stick" and "The Boys From Alabama", they speculated on how criminals might have viewed Pusser.

His name is mentioned in the song "First Blood" on the 2022 album Bleed Out by the American folk-indie band The Mountain Goats.

Pop culture

Pusser was the subject of three biographical books written by W.R. Morris: The Twelfth of August: The Story of Buford Pusser (1971), Buford: True Story of "Walking Tall" Sheriff Buford Pusser (1984), and The State Line Mob: A True Story of Murder and Intrigue (1990). In addition, Morris also created a pictorial history book of Buford called The Legacy of Buford Pusser: A Pictorial History of the "Walking Tall" Sheriff (1997). Pusser's daughter Dwana released a book in 2009 entitled Walking On, which is also an account of his life.

The 1973 movie Walking Tall was based on Pusser's story. It was followed by two sequels in 1975 and 1977, a TV movie in 1978, and a brief TV series in 1981.

A remake by the same title was released in 2004 starring Dwayne Johnson as the main character, renamed Chris Vaughn.

After the success of the 2004 film, Walking Tall: The Payback was released in 2007 direct-to-video. The name of the main character, who was portrayed by Kevin Sorbo, was changed to Nick Prescott, and the movie was set in the Dallas area. Later that year, on September 25, 2007, Sorbo returned in Walking Tall: Lone Justice.

Jimmy Buffett refers to an altercation between  Pusser and himself in the songs "Presents To Send You" and "Semi-True Stories" (from the albums A1A and Beach House on the Moon, respectively). According to Buffet, Pusser and he were staying in the same Nashville motel when Buffet decided to go out for some food and bring it back to the motel. Buffet, who had been drinking, could not find his rental car and decided to climb up on a Cadillac for a better view. That Cadillac turned out to belong to Pusser, who was not at all pleased to find this stranger atop his car.

Pusser is mentioned in season three, episode eight of The Wire by Officer Jimmy McNulty in reference to a sheriff to whom he plans to speak.

Comedian Jeff Foxworthy, in his 1993 studio album, You Might Be a Redneck if..., refers to Buford Pusser in a joke about his wife's childbirth retellings, remarking, "You didn't have more stitches than Buford Pusser".

References

Further reading

External links
 
 Official Buford Pusser Museum Home Page
 Video interview with Buford Pusser
 
 History of Buford Pusser
 Tennessee Historical Marker for Buford Pusser
 

1937 births
1974 deaths
American shooting survivors
Stabbing survivors
People from McNairy County, Tennessee
Tennessee sheriffs
Tennessee Republicans
Road incident deaths in Tennessee
Anti-crime activists
20th-century American politicians
Stabbing attacks in the United States
People from Adamsville, Tennessee